In recent years, the Iranian government states that it has self-sufficiency in essential military hardware and defense systems.

Tehran established an arms development program during the Iran–Iraq War to counter the weapons embargo imposed on it by the US and its Western allies. Since 1993, Iran has manufactured its own tanks, armored personnel carriers, missiles, radars, boats, submarines, unmanned aerial vehicles, and fighter planes.

History

From 1925 to the Iranian Revolution in 1979, Iran used to be equipped with the very latest Western hardware. Cases exist where Iran was supplied with equipment even before it was made standard in the countries that developed it (for example the US F-14 Tomcat, or the British Chieftain Tank). Primary suppliers included the United States, Britain, France, the Federal Republic of Germany (West Germany), Italy, Israel, and the Soviet Union.

The Iran–Iraq War, and post revolutionary sanctions at the time had a dramatic effect on Iran's inventory of western equipment. Under the pressures of war, all supplies were quickly exhausted and replacements became increasingly difficult to come by. The war eventually forced Iran to turn to the Soviet Union, North Korea, Brazil, and China to meet its short term military requirements. Nevertheless, the experience of using quality equipment was not lost on any of the branches of the Iranian armed forces. Disappointed by the older Warsaw Pact equipment, Iran sought to develop its own ability to mirror the technology of its likely enemies, and to provide a totally reliable source of equipment for the future.

After the Iranian revolution, developments in military technology were carried out with the technical support of Russia, China, and North Korea; building upon the foundations established by western contractors. Iranian reliance on these countries has rapidly decreased over the last decade in most sectors as Iran sought to gain total independence; A major exception however, is the aerospace sector, where Iran is still dependent on external help. Iran has, at present, reverse engineered existing foreign hardware, adapted it to their own requirements and then mass-produced the finished product. Examples of this abound, such as the Boragh and the IAMI Azarakhsh. In an attempt to make its military industries more sustainable Iran has also sought to export its military products, see Iranian Military Exports.

Defense production

The following list consists of some weapons systems that Iran manufactures domestically:

Aircraft

 Azarakhsh – modified copy of U.S. F-5 Freedom Fighter, one-seat fighter aircraft, and combat capable trainer.
 Saeqeh – fighter aircraft. Second generation Azarakhsh with a twin canted tail configuration.
 Saeqeh 2 – double-cockpit supersonic fighter jet
 Kowsar – fourth-generation fighter jet
 Shafaq – advanced light fighter/trainer, still in development.
 Qaher-313 – Stealth single-seat multi-role combat aircraft.
 IR.An-140. – licensed production of Ukrainian Antonov An-140
 Parastoo – propeller-driven training aircraft. Reverse engineered Beech F33 Bonanza.
 Dorna – training aircraft
 JT2-2 Tazarv – third generation of the Dorna mentioned above. Still in prototype stage.
 Simorgh (aircraft) – training aircraft.
 Fajr F.3 – Indigenous trainer aircraft
 Bavar 2 – fixed-wing seaplane capable of patrol and reconnaissance missions.
 Saba 248 – medium-weight, double-engine, quadrotor aircraft, capable of carrying eight occupants
 Tizro – training aircraft
 Yasin – training aircraft
 Chakavak (plane) – ultralight training-reconnaissance planes
 Simorgh – light military transport aircraft

Helicopters

 Panha 2091 – overhauled U.S. AH-1J SeaCobra refitted with indigenous components.
 Toufan I, II – helicopter based on AH-1J and produced by Iran Aviation Industries Organization, 10 Toufan I were delivered to Army in May 2010. Improved Toufan II unveiled in January 2013.
 Shabaviz 2061 – overhauled U.S. Bell 206 JetRanger refitted with indigenous components.
 Shabaviz 275 – overhauled U.S. Bell 205 JetRanger refitted with indigenous components
 Bell 214 – Reverse engineered and built in Iran
 HESA Shahed 278 – Developed from Bell 206 & Panha Shabaviz 2061
 HESA Shahed 285 – New Iranian Designed Attack Helicopter
 Sorena (helicopter)
 Shahed 216
Zafar-300: It was the first Iranian made helicopter

Unmanned aerial vehicles
 A1 – A1 is capable of flying for at least two hours, and can carry a 5-kilogram payload.
 AB-3
Ababil – Domestically manufactured surveillance plane. Ababil-5 is for attack missions and the Ababil-T is for short/medium-range attack missions.
 Ababil 2
 Ababil 3 - Among the most advanced UAVs made in Iran
 Arash – a suicide and anti-radar drone with a portable launcher
 Farpad – hand-launched surveillance aircraft
 Fotros – UCAV with a range of 2000 km, flight ceiling of 25,000 ft and 16–30 hours flight endurance, armed with missiles.
 Gaza - a wide-body UAV with a flight endurance of 35 hours and operational range of 2,000 kilometers. It is capable of carrying 13 bombs and 500 kilograms of payload.
 Hamaseh – A medium-range drone, capable of carrying air to ground missiles.
 Kaman-12 (UAV)– combat UAV. The aircraft can fly at 200 kilometers per hour for 10 straight hours. It can use an airstrip as short as 400 meters and covers a 1,000-kilometer combat radius. The UAV weighs 450 kilograms and can carry a payload as heavy as 100 kilograms.
Kaman 22 (UAV)– The first wide-body combat UAV made by Iran. The aircraft can fly at a 3000 km distance for 24 hours.
 Karrar – capable of carrying a military payload of rockets to carry out bombing missions against ground targets. It is also capable of flying long distances at a very high speed.
 Khodkar – wide-body combat and surveillance; using J85 turbojet engine
 Kian – the newest Iranian UCAV
 Kian 2
 Me’raj-214 – Target drone
 Me’raj-504 – Target and suicide drone
 Mobin (UAV)
 Mohajer I/II/III/IV
Mohajer-6 (UAV)
 Mohajer 92
 Nazir (surveillance)
 Oghab – a combat drone capable of carrying air-to-surface missiles
 Omid - an anti-radiation drone used for electronic warfare
 Pelican-2 – a vertical takeoff and landing (VTOL) naval drone.
 Raad 85 – Loitering munition.
 Rad (with offensive capabilities)
 Sabokbal – First Iranian super lightweight drone, capable of recording and dispatching films and can be prepared for flight in less than five minutes.
 Sadeq – a newer version of Mohajer-4
 Saeghe – Target drone
 Saegheh
Sayeh – Reverse-engineered copies of ScanEagle, made on a domestic production line and put into service by the Iranian armed forces.
 H-110 Sarir – capable of carrying air-to-air missiles.
 Sepeher, Shahab-2 and Hodhod-4 – vertical takeoff and landing (VTOL) naval drones
 Shahed 121
 Shahed 129 – UCAV with 24-hour flight capability and armed with Sadid missiles.
 Shahin – a drone that can collect information on the positions and movements of enemy forces on reconnaissance missions
This UAV is capable of three and half hours of non-stop flying, and can carry an 8-kilogram (17-pound) payload.
 Sofreh Mahi – Stealth UCAV (under development)
 Talash 1,2 – Iranian training UAV.
Yasir – Modified version of ScanEagle, it has a 19,500 ft service ceiling, an endurance of 24 hours, and an operational radius of about 750 km.
 Zohal – VTOL unmanned aerial vehicle
 Shahed 136 – A suicide drone (kamikaze)
 Homa, Chamrosh, Jubin, Ababil-4 and Bavar-5 - naval drones
 Safir - training drone
Shahab - training and reconnaissance drone
 Shahed 131 – A suicide drone (kamikaze)
 Meraj-521 - suicide drone similar to the US Switchblade kamikaze drone

Aircraft upgrades and components
 Iran claims to have upgraded its US-made F-4, F-5, and F-14 fighter jets, and produced spare parts including tires, avionics, and engine components.
 Shahed (Observer) flight recorder – able to record flight, image, and sound parameters.
 Jahesh-700 Turbofan engine - Reverse engineered Williams FJ33.
 Owj Turbojet engine - Reverse engineered General Electric J85.
 Toloue-4 Turbojet engine - Reverse engineered Microturbo TRI 60.

Satellite carrier 
 Qaem-100 satellite carrier; the first 3-stage satellite carrier with solid fuel developed by the IRGC Aerospace Force, carries satellites weighing 80 kg into an orbit 500 km above the Earth.

Simulators
 F-4 Phantom Simulator
 Toufan or AH-1J assault helicopter simulator
 Shahed-278 and Bell-206 simulator – Under project Mansour Iran built 27 Bell-206 simulators in 2003.
 Bell 214 simulator – it was built under project Qader-3 and it had cost Iran 17 billion and 500 million rials.
 Submarine Simulator – Iran's "Tareq-class" submarine.
 F-5 Tiger simulator
 Misagh rocket launcher simulator
 Mig-29 Fulcrum simulator
 F-14 Tomcat simulator
 Mirage F-1 simulator
 Hawk and Mersad air defense systems simulator
 Iran-140 full flight simulator (FFS)
 Iran-140 fix base flight simulator
 Fokker-100 fix base flight simulator
 SOCATA TB-21 Trinidad fix base flight simulator
 Emad simulator
 Ilyushin Il-76 simulator

Radar systems

 BSR-1 – VHF radar.
 Matla-ul-fajr I/II radar system
 Kashef 1,2 and 99 radars
 Alvand radar
 Asr (radar) – Asr radar is described by Iranian officials as a S band naval three-dimensional phased array radar with a range of 200 km and capable of simultaneously identifying and intercepting 100 targets at water level or above, this radar will be installed on Jamaran frigates.
 Alim radar system
 RASIT ground-surveillance radar – Iran captured a number of Iraqi radars during the 1980–1988 war, and now manufactures a reverse-engineered version carried aboard a truck
 Thamen – radar system
 Electro-optical/radar system
 E-warfare systems
 Sepehr – OTH radar with a range of 3,000 kilometers in radius
 Najm-802 – Phased array radar system
 Ghadir – The Ghadir radar system which covers areas (maximum) 1,100 km in distance and 300 km in altitude has been designed and built to identify aerial targets, radar-evading aircraft, cruise missiles and ballistic missiles as well as low-altitude satellites.
 Arash – long-range radar, entered service in December 2013.
 Ghamar (3D radar) is an Iranian native production in electronic warfare.
 Khalij-e fars and Moraqeb – three dimensional phased array radar systems that can detect aerial threats up to a range of 800 and 400 kilometers respectively
 Fat’h 14 (Conquer 14) – with a range of 600 kilometers and can detect small airborne targets at a high altitude
 Me’raj 4 – ground-based long-range 3D surveillance radar system
 Nazir – long-range radar system with the capability of detecting radar-evading targets
 Bina
 Kavosh – based on MPQ-50
 Hadi – based on MPQ-46
 Hafez – 3D phased array radar
 Melli – with a range of 450 km
 Jooya
 Alvand
 Tareq
 Basir-110
 GSR-110
 Ofogh
 10th Shahrivar
 Arash I/II
 Mesbah
 Shahab
 Alam ol-Hoda
 Bashir
 Fath-2
 Keyhan
 Afagh – Coastal radar
Falaq (radar) – Reconstructed from Russian 67N6E (GAMMA) 3D radar
 Soroush – it can detect targets with small radar cross-section area (RCS) at low and medium altitudes within a range of 220 kilometers
 Sepehr (Sky) – a smart system for monitoring the small flying objects.
 Quds long-range pulse-array radar
 Alborz - a phased-array three-dimensional radar
 Hormuz tactical mid-range radar

Missiles

Short-range ballistic missiles (SRBM)
Short-range missiles are considered to have a range up to 1000 kilometers.
 Shahab-1 – Liquid-propelled SRBM with a range of 350 km. Copy of Soviet SS-1C/Scud-B
 Shahab-2 – Liquid-propelled SRBM with a range of 750 km. Copy of Soviet SS-1D/Scud-C
 Qiam 1 – Liquid-propelled SRBM with a range of 750 km. Has a smart targeting system.
 Naze'at – Unguided rocket series.
 Zelzal 1/2/3/3B – Single-stage SRBM with a range of 200 to 400 km
 Fateh-110 – Single-stage solid-propelled SRBM with a range of 300 km. 
 Fath-360 – An Iranian short-range tactical ballistic missile with range of 80 to 100 km. 
Fateh-313 – Solid-propelled SRBM with a range of 500 km.  
 Raad-500 – Solid-propelled SRBM with a range of 500 km. Tactical lightweight variant of Fateh-110 family of tactical SRBM with a 200 km increased range
 Zolfaqar – Solid-propelled SRBM with a range of 750 km.
Khalij Fars – Solid-propelled anti-ship SRBM with a range of 300 km.
Hormuz-1 – Solid-propelled anti-radar and anti-ship SRBM with a range of 300 km.
Hormuz-2 – Solid-propelled anti-ship SRBM with a range of 300 km.
Fateh-Mobin – Solid-propelled SRBM with a range of 300 km.

Medium-range ballistic missiles (MRBM) 
Medium-range missiles are considered to have a range between 1000 and 3000 kilometers.
 Shahab-3A/B/C – Liquid-propelled MRBM with a range of 1,200 km to 2,100 km.
 Ghadr-110 – Liquid-propelled MRBM with a range of 2000–3000 km.
 Emad – Liquid-propelled MRBM with a range of 2000 km. Improved version of Shahab-3 with 500-meter precision.
 Khorramshahr – Liquid-propelled MRBM with a range of 2000 km. Capable of carrying multiple warheads.
 Fajr-3 – MIRV warhead.
Dezful – Solid-propelled SRBM with a range of 1000 km. 
 Martyr Hajj Qassem Soleimani – Solid-propelled MRBM with a range close to 1,400 kilometers.
 Ashoura – Two-staged solid-propelled MRBM with a range of 2,000 km.
 Sejjil – Two-stage solid-propelled MRBM with a range of 2000 km.
 Kheybarshekan (Kheibarshekan) – Precision-Striking Ballistic Missile, a range of 1,450 km. The mentioned ballistic missile is among third-generation long-range missiles indigenously developed/manufactured by military experts at the IRGC's Aerospace Division.
 Rezvan - Liquid fueled missile with a 1,400 km range.
 Unnamed anti-ship ballistic missile with a reported range of 1500 km and a speed of 8 Mach.

Cruise missiles
 Nasr-1 – Iranian-made short-range missiles.
 Meshkat – Iranian cruise missile with a range of 2000 kilometers.
 Qader – Iranian anti-ship cruise missile with a range over 200 km.
 Ya-Ali – Iranian land attack cruise missile with 700 km range.
 Soumar – copy of the Raduga Kh-55.
 Noor – Anti-ship cruise missile based on C-802
 Kowsar – medium-range, land-based anti-ship missile
 Ghadir
 Nasr-e Basir – Anti-ship cruise missile
 Zafar – Anti-ship cruise missile
 Nasir – anti-ship cruise missile
 Hoveyzeh- Surface-to-surface cruise missile with a range of 1350 km.
 Haj Qasem (missile)  ballistic missile which was unveiled on 20 August 2020 
 Martyr Abu Mahdi al-Muhandis – cruise missile with a range of 1,000 kilometers
 Heidar 1 and 2 - Heidar-1 is UAV-launched, it has a range of 200 km and a speed of 1000 km/h.
 Asef - air launched long range missile installed on the Sukhoi Su-24
 Paveh - hypersonic cruise missile with a range of 1,650 km and a reported speed of 12 Mach

Anti-tank missiles
 Raad – copy of Soviet AT-3 Sagger
 RPG-7 – Copy of Soviet RPG-7. Iran forecasted to manufacture 2.88 percent of the worlds RPG-7's by 2014.
 RPG-29
 Saegheh – improved version of the RPG-7
 Toophan – Copy of American TOW missile
 Toophan 2 – Improved Toophan
 Toophan 5 – Anti-armor, anti-tank missile with two warheads
 Saeghe 1/2 – reverse engineered M47 Dragon
 Towsan – Iranian version of the 9M113 Konkurs/AT-5 Spandrel
 Dehlaviyeh – Locally produced version of the Kornet-E
 Tondar – Iranian made version of 9M119 Svir ATGM with max range of 4,000 meters.
 Pirooz – anti-tank guided missile
 Qare'a (rocket launcher)
 Tondar (missile)

Recoilless rifles
 SPG-9 – reverse engineered version of 73 mm SPG-9 recoilless rifle
 106mm Recoilless rifle – Iranian version of M40 A2 recoilless rifle
 Nafez-2 – anti-armor launcher

Air defense weapons

 Khordad 15 – Surface-to-air missile (SAM) system
 Qaem – anti-helicopter, lightweight, laser-guided missile
 Raad – anti-helicopter system.
 Misagh-1 – copy of Chinese QW-1 Vanguard with upgrades
 Misagh-2 – copy of Chinese QW-2 Vanguard
 Misagh-3
 23mm Anti-Aircraft Gun – Iranian version of ZU-23 which comes in one or two barrel configurations
 Samavat 35 mm Anti-Aircraft Guns – Copy of Oerlikon 35 mm twin cannon skyguard
 Sa'ir 100 mm Anti-Aircraft Guns – Upgraded automatic version of KS-19 100 m gun, it can detect and intercept targets automatically through radar or optical systems at low and medium altitude
 Shahab-e-Saqeb (missile) – copy of the Chinese HQ-7 (FM-80)
 SM-1 copy of RIM-66 Standard.
 Sayyad-1 / Sayyad-1A – upgraded copy of Chinese HQ-2, Sayyad-1A has IR tracking.
 Sayyad-2 (Hunter II). Upgraded version of the Sayyad-1 system with higher precision, range and defensive power. It is equipped with a 200-kilogram warhead and has a speed of 1,200 meters per second. The Sayyad-1 missile defense system is composed of two-stage missiles that can target all kinds of aircraft, including bombers, at medium and high altitudes.
 Fajr-8 – upgrade of S-200
 Fajr-27 – advanced sea rapid fire cannon
 Fath (victory) – the 40-millimeter naval cannon's range is 12 km and shoots 300 projectiles per minute.
 Mersad – Iran's first advanced air defense system based on the US MIM-23 Hawk. It is capable of hitting modern aircraft flying at low and medium altitudes. The Mersad system is equipped with sophisticated radar signal processing technology, an advanced launcher, and electronic equipment for guidance and target acquisition. Mersad uses domestically manufactured Shahin missiles.
 Mesbah 1 air defense system – can target and destroy fighters, helicopters, cruise missiles and other objects flying at low altitude. Mesbah 1 is equipped with a three-dimensional interception radar and an optical guidance system. Mesbah 1 can fire four thousand rounds per minute.
 Mehrab (altar) – surface-to-air medium-range smart missile. The Mehrab missile is equipped with anti-radar and anti-jamming systems, and if the enemy tries to jam the guidance system of the missile, it immediately identifies the source of the interference and changes its course toward the source and destroys the jammer.
 Raad – Air defence system with range of 50 kilometers and engagement altitude of 25 to 27 kilometers
 Bavar-373 – Iran-made air defense system carrying surface-to-air Sayyad-4 (missile)), which uses two or three types of missiles to confront aerial targets in different layers.
 Ya Zahra – Low-altitude mobile air defense system.
 Soheil – Quadruped- MANPADS missile launcher, which can detect and intercept aerial targets.
 Herz-9 – Passive low-altitude mobile air defense system with an operating range of 10 km and operating altitude of 5 km.
 Talaash - A mid-range, high-altitude missile mobile air defense missile system which uses an upgraded copy of SM-1 (RIM-66) missile called Sayyad-2, in November 2013 Iran launched the production line of Sayyad-2 missile. It can also use Sayyad-3 missiles.
 Asefeh – Asefeh is three-barrelled 23 mm Gatling gun that is reportedly capable of firing up to 900 rounds a minute, it is currently under development by IRGC ground force and will be used as a close in weapon system to defend against cruise missiles.
 3rd Khordad – missile system with a range of 75 kilometers and an altitude of 30 kilometers
 Tabas – missile system with a range of 60 kilometers and an altitude of 30 kilometers
 Damavand - A long-range missile system
 Zolfaqar - A low-altitude missile system
 Majid
 9 of Dey - A missile system which is capable of engaging and destroying cruise missiles and drones.
 Tactical Sayyad - Towed system with 3 missiles and a phased-array radar
 Lt. General Qassem Soleimani - Ship point air defense missile/gun sustem
 Navvab

Air-to-ground munitions
 Qadr – Electro-optically guided 2000 lb glide-bomb
 Zoobin – Electro-optically guided 750 lb glide-bomb
 Akhgar (missile) – The 1.7-meter-long, television-guided missile has a range of 30 kilometers and can fly at a speed of 600 kilometers per hour.
 Sattar 1/2/3/4 – Medium Range air-to-ground missiles.
 Qassed I/II/III – Electro-optically guided 2000 lb bomb. Qassed-2 has a range of about 50 km, Qassed-3 has a range of over 100 km
 Asre – Laser-guided air-to-ground missile.
 Kite – Stand-off sub-munitions dispenser.
 Yasser – 750 lb air-to-ground missile. Was created by simply removing the nose section of the MIM-23 and replacing it with a modified M117 gravity bomb with its tail fins removed.
 Bina – Laser-guided air-to-ground and ground-to-ground missile. It appears to be an AGM-65 Maverick air-to-ground missile with a semi-active laser (SAL) seeker fitted to its nose.
 Sadid-1 – Light air to ground missile.
 Shafaq
 Balaban – Satellite-guided long-range bomb
 Yasin – 50-km range guided bomb
Qaem 1/5/9 – Electro-optically or thermally-guided weapon.
Qaem 114 – Electro-optically guided anti-armor 1,000 mm penetrating dual-charge warhead missile similar to the US-made AGM-114 Hellfire
 Fadak – 2-4-km range guided or unguided 80mm and 11–16 kg weight air-to-ground rocket with a high-explosive anti-armor warhead and a speed of 700 meters per second
 Heidar (missile), an air-to-ground missile
 Almas – guided top attack missile for the Ababil-3 drones. A ground-launched version was delivered to the IRGC Ground Force in July 2021.

Air-to-air missiles
 Fatter – copy of U.S. AIM-9 Sidewinder
 Sedjil – copy of U.S. MIM-23 Hawk converted to be carried by aircraft
 Fakour 90 – Iranian version of AIM-54 Phoenix, it was successfully tested in February 2013.
 Azarakhsh – carried by homegrown ‘Karrar’ drones
 Zubin guided missile

Naval missiles
 Ra'ad – Indigenously developed long-range anti-ship missile based on HY-2 Silkworm.
 Fajre Darya- copy of Sea Killer II.
 Kowsar 1/2/3 – Several versions based on Chinese C-701, TL-10 and C-704
 Nasr – Several versions based on TL-6 and C-705
 Tondar – upgraded copy of Chinese C-801. Similar to Noor but powered by solid rocket booster and range of 50 km.
 Thaqeb – Similar to Noor, modified for submarine launch.
 Noor – upgraded copy of Chinese C-802.
 Qader – Iranian anti-ship cruise missile with a range over 200 km.
 Khalij Fars – Anti ship ballistic missile based on Fateh-110
 Zafar – Indigenously developed short-range anti-ship missile.
 Hormuz I/II – naval strike ballistic missile that can hit mobile targets at sea with high precision
 Jask-2 – Submarine-launched cruise missile

Torpedoes
 Kuse
 Yasin
 Hoot – A supercavitation torpedo. Possible copy of the Russian VA-111 Shkval.
 Valfajr
 Miad

Anti-submarine
 Dehlaviyeh – laser-guided anti-submarine missile

Armored Vehicles
 Zulfiqar-1 MBT – Developed from U.S. M60 Patton and Russian T-72
 Zulfiqar-2 MBT - Further development of Zulfiqar-1, prototypes only
 Zulfiqar-3 MBT - 
 T-72Z Safir-74 – Indigenously upgraded Soviet T-54/55 and Chinese Type 59
 Mobarez – Indigenous upgrade of British Chieftain.
 Sabalan – An Iranian upgraded version of the US M47M, It has side skirts and a newly built turret fitted with a 105-mm gun, laser range finder, new fire control system and communication equipment.
 T-72S – Soviet T-72 produced under license in Iran. Currently under upgrade.
 Karrar (tank) – 800 on order, unknown number received. Similar to Russian T-90M.
 Sayyad – Quick reaction vehicle for unconventional warfare.
 Tosan – Iranian light tank for unconventional warfare, developed from British FV101 Scorpion.
 Cobra BMT-2 – Concept vehicle for the Boragh armed with 23 mm anti-aircraft gun for use as a fire support vehicle.
 Boragh – Copy of Soviet BMP-1 with indigenous upgrades
 Rakhsh – Iranian developed 4x4 armored personnel carrier
 Sarir or Tala'iyeh – Newly developed 4x4 armored personnel carrier for IRGC
 Hoveizeh – Ultra-light tracked APC.
 Aqareb – wheeled battle tank
 Heidar-5 – wheeled minelayer armored vehicle
 Heidar-6 – 8x8 APC
Toofan- Four-wheel drive APC with protection against land mines and improvised explosive device.
 Ra'ad – 6x6 heavy MRAP
 Heidar-7 – Based on BTR-60PB with TV remote control station for ZU-23-2 and fitted with ERA all-around hull to protect it from ATGMs
 Makran IFV – Upgrade of the BTR-50PK with a new unmanned turret equipped with a 30mm Shipunov 2A42 and 7.62mm machine gun, newly welded frontal and side armor, a new engine, and new electronics.

Other vehicles

 Sepehr – Iranian tactical vehicle
 Safir Jeep
 Tondar 1.4 ton tactical car
 Kaviran – 3.4 ton tactical car
 Neynava – 4x4 military truck of Iran-made
 BABR 400 – 8x8 heavy military truck, based on Soviet MAZ-537
 Aras l/ll/3 Tactical Vehicle – 3.4 ton Tactical Vehicle
 Zoljanah heavy truck – 10x10 heavy duty truck
 Zolfaqar – torpedo-armed watercraft
 Shahid Mohammad Nazeri – long-range and fast cruising watercraft
 Zafar – 8x8 heavy truck, built for Bavar 373
 Pooriya – Tank transporter
 Samandar
 Fallagh – ultra-light tracked combat vehicle with remote weapon station
 Nazir – Unmanned Ground Vehicle armed with missile
 Network-based intelligent robot (Heydar 1) – It has 6x6 active wheels, load-carrying and high-explosive capabilities, 360° degree rotation and barrier detection. It has a rifle (AK platform) and is capable of targeting and firing automatically at targets and there is also a suicide version for striking the tanks with below hit.
 Roo'in tan – It is a lightweight tactical bulletproof car that is resistant to steel core bullets up to .50cal
 Kian 500/700 – Tank transporters
 Caracal – It is an armed ground based robot
 Nazir rocket launcher (robot)
 Hafez EOD or fire-fighting robot
 Qasim UGV carrying a multicopter unmanned aircraft
 Fajr cameraman robot
 Younes small unmanned underwater vehicle

Mortars
 37mm Marsh Mortar – A compact commando mortar developed by the Iranian Army during the Iran-Iraq War
 HM 12 – 60 mm mortar
 HM 13 – 60 mm mortar
 HM 14 – 60 mm mortar
 HM 15 – 81 mm mortar
 HM 16 – 120 mm mortar
 Razm Mortar – 120 mm mortar
 Vafa Mortar – 160 mm mortar.
 120 mm mortar shells
 130 mm mortar shells

Artillery
 HM 40 – A 122 mm howitzer
 HM 41 – A 155 mm howitzer
 Wheeled 155-mm self-propelled howitzer
 Raad 1 – SP gun Chinese Type WZ 501/503 armored infantry fighting vehicle with Russian 122 mm gun mounted on top.
 Raad 2 – SP gun based on the U.S. M109 howitzer
 Basir – Laser-guided 155 mm artillery shell capable of engaging moving targets at the range of 20 km.
 Sa’eqeh – remote-controlled anti-helicopter mine with range of 300m
 Baher – 23 mm-caliber anti-aircraft gun
 Nasir – guided shell
 Sayad – anti helicopter mine with vertical range of 100–150 meters
 JAHM – anti helicopter mine with range of 150–180 meters

Rocket Artillery
 HM 20 – Iranian version of the BM-21
 Arash – Iranian 122 mm unguided artillery rocket which was recently turned into a guided weapon
 Oghab – Iranian 230 mm unguided artillery rocket
 Falaq-1 – Iranian 240 mm unguided artillery rocket similar to BM-24
 Falaq-2 – Iranian 333 mm unguided artillery rocket
 Fajr-1 – Iranian version of 107 mm Type 63 MRS artillery rocket
 Fajr-3 – artillery rocket
 Fajr-5 – artillery rocket
 Fateh-313 – solid-fuel precision-guided rocket with a range of 500 km
 Fath-360 - Satellite-guided MLRS-launched rocket with 5,000 km/h speed

Small arms
 MPT-9 – Tondar submachine gun – copy of MP5 (H&K licensed production)
 KH-2002 – 5.56mm bullpup conversion kit for the M-16
 S-5.56 – copy of Norinco CQ, Chinese clone of the M-16
 KL-7.62 – copy of AKM
 G3A6 – copy of H&K G3A3 7.62 mm (H&K licensed production)
 MGA3 – copy of MG3 7.62 mm (Rheinmetal licensed production)
 PC-9 "Zoaf" – copy of Swiss-German SIG P226 pistol
 PKM-T80 – copy of Soviet PKM
 MGD-12.7mm – copy of Soviet DShkM
 Nakhjir – copy of Soviet SVD
 Sayyad – Iranian Steyr HS .50 clone with slightly different muzzle brake and curved pistol grip.
 Shaher – Iranian developed 14.5mm sniper rifle.
 Arash – Indigenous 20mm sniper rifle.
 Akhgar – Iranian made 7.62mm Gatling gun capable of firing 4,000 to 6,000 rounds per minute.
 Moharram – Iranian made 12.7mm Gatling gun capable of firing 2,500 rounds per minute.
 Fateh – Iranian clone of American XCR-L
 Nasr – 12.7mm sniper
 Masaf
 Sama
 Fajr 224
 Baher – 23mm caliber sniper rifle
 Taher – sniper rifle
 Siavash – sniper rifle
 Taktab – anti-material rifle
 Nasir – 40mm automatic grenade launcher
 Zolfaqar
 Heidar – 12.7mm sniper rifle
 Ashtar – 7.62×64mm sniper rifle
 Sa'aban-1 – Iranian upgrade of the old Russian-made RPD

Boats and destroyers
 Sina class – heavily upgraded, French Kaman (Combattante II) class missile boats.
 Paykan
 Joshan
 Derafsh
 Separ
 Zereh
 Moudge class – upgraded and modified British Alvand (Saam) class (aka Vosper Mk 5 type) frigates.
  – multi-mission frigate with a displacement of around 1,400 tonnes, can carry 120–140 personnel on board and is armed with a variety of anti-ship and surface-to-air missiles.
 
 
 
 Zolfaqhar – fast attack craft/missile boat
 Seraj – high-speed attack craft
 Yunes 6 – six-passenger hovercraft
 Tondar – Hovercraft with missile/drone launch capability
 Azarakhsh-clas missile boat – based on C 14-class missile boat
 Tir
 Ya Mahdi
 Bavar GEV
 Hendijan

Submarines
 Besat Class Submarine

Midget Submarines
 Ghadir Class Submarine
 Nahang Class Submarine
 Fateh Class Submarine

Other
 Missile Magazine System
1 bulletproof vest
 Dome and Directional Breakers
 "Samat" cameras for the RF-4 reconnaissance aircraft
 ‘Samam’ location data management system
 mobile electro-optical monitoring system Jalal.
 T-10 and T-11 parachutes
 Maham-II helicopter launched naval mine

See also

 Defense Industries Organization
 Economy of Iran
 International rankings of Iran
 Iran Aviation Industries Organization
 Iran Electronics Industries
 Iranian Space Agency
 Iranian underground missile bases
 Military of Iran
 Science and technology in Iran

References

External links

 Business Monitor International: Iran Defence and Security Report (2012)

 

 
Iran
Iranian military-related lists